Lana Therese Condor (born Trần Đồng Lan; May 11, 1997) is an American actress, producer, and singer. She made her acting debut starring as Jubilee in the superhero film X-Men: Apocalypse (2016), and gained international recognition for portraying Lara Jean Covey in the romantic-comedy To All the Boys film series (2018–2021). She has also portrayed Saya Kuroki in the television series Deadly Class (2019) and Koyomi in the film Alita: Battle Angel (2019).

Early life
Born in Vietnam, Condor lived her first months in an orphanage in Cần Thơ under the name Trần Đồng Lan. On October 6, 1997 she was adopted and renamed by American parents Mary Carol Condor (née Haubold) and Bob Condor in Chicago, Illinois. Condor has an adoptive brother, Arthur. Condor and her family lived in Whidbey Island, Washington, and New York City.

Condor studied ballet as a child, training with the Whidbey Island Dance Theater, Joffrey Ballet, the Rock School for Dance Education, and the Alvin Ailey American Dance Theater. She continued dancing with the Los Angeles Ballet and also trained at the Groundlings in improvisational theatre. She studied acting the New York Film Academy and Yale Summer Conservatory for Actors, and in 2014 was a theatre scholar at the California State Summer School for the Arts. As a high school freshman, she attended the Professional Performing Arts School in New York City, and graduated from Notre Dame Academy in Los Angeles in 2015. In 2016 she was accepted at Loyola Marymount University but chose to postpone it to pursue acting.

Career
Condor made her acting debut as the mutant Jubilation Lee / Jubilee in Bryan Singer's 2016 superhero film X-Men: Apocalypse. That year, she also appeared in Peter Berg's drama film Patriots Day, which depicted the events and aftermath of the Boston Marathon bombing.
In 2017, Condor co-starred in the Lifetime romantic thriller film High School Lover. The following year, she gained recognition for her lead role as Lara Jean Covey in Netflix's romantic drama film To All the Boys I've Loved Before, directed by Susan Johnson and based on Jenny Han's young adult novel of the same name. For the role, she was nominated for a Teen Choice Award.

In 2019, Condor portrayed the assassin Saya Kuroki in Syfy's action drama series Deadly Class, based on the Rick Remender comic book series of the same name. She also appeared as Koyomi in Robert Rodriguez's science fiction film Alita: Battle Angel based on the graphic novel series by Yukito Kishiro. Condor also voiced the character of Kaoru in the Netflix stop-motion animated series Rilakkuma and Kaoru (2019), guest starred as the voice of Casey in the Netflix series BoJack Horseman, and co-starred in the coming-of-age romantic comedy Summer Night (2019), directed by Joseph Cross.

In 2020, Condor reprised her role as Lara Jean Covey in To All the Boys: P.S. I Still Love You, directed by Michael Fimognari, the second installment of the film series. The following year, she starred once again as Lara Jean Covey in To All the Boys: Always and Forever, the third and final installment of the trilogy.

Within two months of posting her first video to YouTube in February 2020, Condor's channel had over 475,000 subscribers and more than 9.8million views.

In 2022, Condor was executive producer of and acted in the lead role in Boo, Bitch, a comedy series on Netflix. She has also been cast in the Marianna Palka–directed comedy Girls Night, and will appear in the Looney Tunes live action comedy film Coyote vs. Acme.

Personal life
Condor has been in a relationship with singer and actor Anthony De La Torre since 2015. The couple announced their engagement on January 28, 2022. They live together in Seattle, Washington.

Filmography

Film

Television

Awards and nominations

References

External links

 
 
 

1997 births
21st-century American actresses
Actresses from Chicago
Actresses from Santa Monica, California
Actresses of Vietnamese descent
American adoptees
American film actresses
American television actresses
American voice actresses
Living people
Los Angeles Ballet dancers
New York Film Academy alumni
People from Cần Thơ
Vietnamese emigrants to the United States
American YouTubers